Göyük (also, Köyük, Gëyuk and Keyuk) is a village and municipality in the Aghjabadi Rayon of Azerbaijan.  It has a population of 737.

References 

Populated places in Aghjabadi District